The Mixed individual road race CP1-2 event at the 2008 Summer Paralympics took place on September 13 at the Changping Triathlon Venue. The race distance was 24.2 km.

References

Cycling at the 2008 Summer Paralympics